The men's javelin throw at the 2013 Asian Athletics Championships was held at the Shree Shiv Chhatrapati Sports Complex on 5 July.

Results

References
 Results

Javelin
Javelin throw at the Asian Athletics Championships